The women's masters competition at the 2014 Asian Games in Incheon was held on 1 and 2 October 2014 at Anyang Hogye Gymnasium.

The Masters event comprises the top 16 bowlers (maximum two per country) from the all-events competition.

Schedule
All times are Korea Standard Time (UTC+09:00)

Results

Preliminary

Stepladder finals

References 

Results at ABF Website

External links
Official website

Women's masters